Naomi Broady and Storm Sanders were the defending champions, having won the event in 2013, but Broady chose not to participate. Sanders partnered with Daria Gavrilova and successfully defended her title, defeating Maria Sanchez and Zoë Gwen Scandalis in the final, 6–2, 6–1.

Seeds

Draw

References 
 Draw

Fsp Gold River Women's Challenger - Doubles
FSP Gold River Women's Challenger